Keith Chan may refer to:

 Keith Chan Fai-young (born 1970), composer
 Keith Chan Siu-kei, composer
 Keith Chan (racing driver) (born 1977), Hong Kong racing driver